"Cops Shot the Kid" is a song by American rapper Nas, featuring fellow rap artist Kanye West, from his eleventh studio album, Nasir (2018).

Background
Nas took to Instagram shortly after the song had generated attention as a standout from the album and paid homage to Slick Rick, since he's sampled and behind the inspiration for it.

In October 2020, a snippet of the original version of the song featuring an unreleased guest verse from André 3000 surfaced online.

Composition
For the background vocals saying: "The cops shot the kid" throughout the vast majority of "Cops Shot the Kid", a sample from "Children's Story" by Slick Rick is used. The speech in the track's intro is sampled 
from a scene including Richard Pryor in 1973 Stax Records film Wattstax.

Critical reception
The song received mostly positive reviews. NME described it as being: 'a track full of evocative images', and labelled the Rick sample as being both 'breathless' and 'frantic'. Rolling Stone viewed "Cops Shot the Kid" as being the album's 'most cogent song' and branded West's appearance as a 'lone guest verse'.

Commercial performance
Upon the release of Nasir, the track debuted at number 96 on the US Billboard Hot 100. This made it the only song from the album to enter that chart.

Charts

References

2018 songs
Nas songs
Kanye West songs
Song recordings produced by Kanye West
Songs written by Nas
Songs written by Kanye West
Songs written by Rhymefest
Songs against racism and xenophobia
Songs about police brutality
Songs about black people
Songs based on speech samples
Songs written by Slick Rick